Wallgrove Army Base was an Australian Army camp and base at Wallgrove, (renamed Eastern Creek), New South Wales, Australia.

The camp was utilised as a staging and training area during World War II.

After World War II, the camp was utilised as an army wireless chain and as a migrant hostel.

Wallgrove Army Base was on the site of the now defunct amusement park called Wonderland Sydney. The site has recently been redeveloped to build an industrial park. Eastern Creek Raceway, the M4 Motorway and the M7 Motorway have also been built on or near the site.

Australian Army units based at the Wallgrove Army Base

21st Light Horse Regiment – 1940
2/19th Battalion – July 1940 
3rd Infantry Battalion – December  1940
9th Australian Division – February 1943
53rd Anti-Aircraft (Composite) Regiment – August 1943
2/25th Australian Infantry Battalion – April 1944
2/31st Australian Infantry Battalion – April 1944
6th Machine Gun Battalion

Post-war, the 176 Air Dispatch Company was based there.
5 Signal Regt. 610 Sig troop transmitting station 1960?–1977 then RAAF

References
 Pacific War Wreck Database
 OzatWar website

Military history of Sydney during World War II
Migrant hostels in Australia